The  took place at the New National Theater in Tokyo on December 30, 2011. The ceremony was televised in Japan on TBS.

Presenters 
 Masaaki Sakai
 Norika Fujiwara
 Shinichirō Azumi (TBS commentator)
 Sylwia Kato (TBS commentator)
 Erina Masuda (TBS commentator)

 Radio
 Masao Mukai (TBS commentator)

Winners and winning works

Grand Prix 
 AKB48 — "Flying Get"

Best Singer Award 
 Fuyumi Sakamoto

Best New Artist Award 
 Fairies

Best Album Award 
 Kazumasa Oda —

New Artist Award 
The artists who are awarded the New Artist Award are nominated for the Best New Artist Award.
 
 Super Girls
 2NE1
 Fairies

References

External links 
 Official results page

2011
Japan Record Awards
Japan Record Awards
Japan Record Awards
Japan Record Awards